Forrest Silas Petersen (May 16, 1922 – December 8, 1990), (VADM, USN), was a United States Navy aviator and test pilot.  He was one of twelve pilots who flew the North American X-15, an experimental spaceplane jointly operated by the Air Force and NASA.

Birth and education
Born May 16, 1922, in Holdrege, Nebraska, he was the son of Elmer and Stella Petersen, and was raised in Gibbon, Nebraska. He graduated from Gibbon High School in 1939. Prior to his admission to the United States Naval Academy, he attended the University of Nebraska for two years.

Military career
He graduated from the U.S. Naval Academy in 1944 with a Naval Science degree. He was commissioned as an ensign and reported to the destroyer . While serving aboard USS Caperton, he participated in campaigns in the Philippines, Formosa and Okinawa. After graduation from flight training in 1947, he was assigned to Fighting Squadron Twenty Able which was later redesignated Fighter Squadron 192.

Petersen graduated from the U.S. Naval Postgraduate School with a Bachelor of Science degree in Aeronautical Engineering in July 1950. He continued studies for one year at Princeton University and received a Master of Science degree in Engineering. From 1953 to 1956 he served with Fighter Squadron 51. In 1956, he was selected to attend the U.S. Naval Test Pilot School, and remained as an instructor following graduation.

In August 1958, he was assigned duties as Research Pilot in the X-15 Program and served at the Dryden Flight Research Center at Edwards Air Force Base, California until January 1962. He was one of the initial three test pilots, with Joe Walker, Bob White, and contractor pilot Scott Crossfield.
He was the only active duty Navy pilot to fly the X-15 (John B. McKay, Milton O. Thompson, Scott Crossfield and Neil Armstrong were former Navy pilots). In July 1962, he was a joint recipient of the Collier Trophy, which was presented by President John F. Kennedy, and the NASA Distinguished Service Medal, which was presented by Vice President Lyndon B. Johnson.

Petersen served as Commanding Officer of Fighter Squadron 154 prior to being assigned to the office of Director, Division of Naval Reactors, Atomic Energy Commission for Nuclear Power Training. He reported to the aircraft carrier  in January 1964 and served as Executive Officer until April 1966. He was awarded the Bronze Star for duty during Enterprises first combat tour in Vietnam. Following an eight-month deployment with the United States Seventh Fleet Amphibious Forces in the Western Pacific, he was awarded the Navy Commendation Medal with Combat V.  He then served as Commanding Officer of USS Enterprise (July 8, 1969 – December 3, 1971). He was then assigned duties as an Assistant to the Director of Naval Program Planning in the office of the Chief of Naval Operations. In 1974, he went on to command Combined Task Force 60 (CTF-60) based at Athens, Greece. In 1975 he came back to the Pentagon to head the Naval Air Operations office. He then headed the Naval Air Systems Command, from which he retired in 1980.

Awards and decorations

Petersen held the following awards for service in World War II, Korean War and the Vietnam War: Legion of Merit, Distinguished Flying Cross, Bronze Star, Navy Commendation Medal (with "Combat V"), American Defense Service Medal, Asiatic-Pacific Campaign Medal, American Campaign Medal, China Service Medal, Army of Occupation Medal (with "Japan" clasp), Philippine Liberation Medal, Philippine Presidential Unit Citation, World War II Victory Medal, Korean Service Medal, United Nations Service Medal, Vietnam Service Medal, Vietnam Campaign Medal, National Defense Service Medal (with bronze service star), Korean War Service Medal, and the NASA Distinguished Service Medal. In 1962 he also received the John J. Montgomery Award. The midshipman library at the University of Nebraska is named in honor of Admiral Petersen.

Family

Petersen married June Berkshire on February 2, 1946. They had three children: Lynn Elizabeth, Nels Christian, and Forrest Dean. June died on May 8, 1977.
He subsequently married Jean Baldwin on June 17, 1978; she had a son, Preston. She died in 2005.

Death and burial
He died on December 8, 1990, in Georgetown, South Carolina from a brain tumor, at age 68. He is buried at Arlington National Cemetery.

References

Notes

Bibliography
 Thompson, Milton O. (1992) At The Edge Of Space: The X-15 Flight Program, Smithsonian Institution Press, Washington and London. 
 NASA website source of text
 "VAdm. Forrest. S. Petersen", pictopia
 Biographies of U.S. Astronauts

1922 births
1990 deaths
American aviators
Aviators from Nebraska
American test pilots
People from Holdrege, Nebraska
United States Naval Academy alumni
Naval Postgraduate School alumni
Princeton University alumni
University of Nebraska alumni
United States Navy admirals
United States Naval Aviators
American aerospace engineers
American electrical engineers
United States Navy personnel of World War II
United States Navy personnel of the Korean War
United States Navy personnel of the Vietnam War
Burials at Arlington National Cemetery
Deaths from brain cancer in the United States
Deaths from cancer in South Carolina
Recipients of the Legion of Merit
Recipients of the Distinguished Flying Cross (United States)
Recipients of the NASA Distinguished Service Medal
Collier Trophy recipients
NASA people
X-15 program
20th-century American engineers
American flight instructors